The East Des Moines Union Depot is in a Dutch Revival style in the Market District of Des Moines, Iowa. Construction of the East Des Moines Union Depot was completed in 1909. The building is in the East Village Historic District, east of the Des Moines River. The depot was built by William H. Brereton for the Des Moines Union Railway, and served the Wabash Railroad, Chicago Great Western Railway and Milwaukee Railway, Chicago Burlington Quincy Railroad and the Des Moines, Iowa Falls & Northern Railway. The building operated as a depot until the 1950s when it was sold and converted to cold storage for tomatoes. In 2017 the building was purchased by The Des Moines Heritage Trust which completed a $4 million renovation in 2021.

References

Former railway stations in Iowa
Transportation buildings and structures in Polk County, Iowa